Tom Wittum (January 11, 1950 – January 22, 2010) was an American football player. He had a 5-year career in the National Football League from 1973 to 1977 as a punter. He played in two Pro Bowls as a member of the San Francisco 49ers.

A native of Berwyn, Wittum grew up in Round Lake.  A fifth-round pick of the Chicago White Sox in 1968, Wittum instead chose to attend Northern Illinois University. He was a three-year letter-winner in football for the Huskies from 1969 to 1971, and lettered four years (1969–72) as a third baseman for the NIU baseball team. He was inducted as an individual into the NIU Hall of Fame in 1987 and was a member of the Huskies' 1972 NCAA baseball team enshrined in 2008.

Wittum left Northern Illinois with 10 kicking records, including the school's career, single-season and single-game records for punts, punting yards and punting average. For his career, he averaged 40.39 yards on 228 punts for 9,210 total yards, numbers which as of January 2010 rank third, fourth and third, respectively, in the Huskie record book. As of January 2010 he still holds the top three single season totals for punts and punting yards with 78 for 3,129.

Wittum ranks eighth all-time at NIU in points by a kicker with 113 on 21 field goals and 50 PATs, all NIU records at the time. His career field-goal totals of 21 made on 37 attempts, also school records at the time, are the eighth and seventh-most in school history. He made 50 of 55 extra-point attempts from 1969 to 1971 and is eighth in the Huskie record book in those categories.

He shares the Pro Bowl record for longest punt with Darren Bennett (64 yards).  He also currently holds the #2 spot for most punts in a Pro Bowl game, with 9.

He retired from the NFL after a serious car accident left him with several broken bones in 1978.  After he retired, Wittum taught driver's education classes at Grayslake Central High School in Grayslake, Illinois. He died of cancer on January 22, 2010.

References

External links
 Crumpacker, John. "Beat: Ex-Punter Wittum dies of cancer," San Francisco Chronicle, Wednesday, January 27, 2010.
 Bio

1950 births
2010 deaths
People from Berwyn, Illinois
American football punters
Northern Illinois Huskies football players
San Francisco 49ers players
National Conference Pro Bowl players